Kirkby-in-Ashfield railway station serves the town of Kirkby-in-Ashfield in Nottinghamshire, England. The station is on the Robin Hood Line and is operated by East Midlands Railway between Nottingham and Worksop.

History

Kirkby-in-Ashfield was served by three railway stations:
Kirkby-in-Ashfield Central station (closed 1962) was located 700m to the west of the present station on the former Great Central Railway Mansfield Central branch.
Kirkby-in-Ashfield East station (closed 1964) was 350m to the east of the present station on the former Midland Railway Nottingham to Worksop line.
Kirkby Bentinck station (closed 1963) was located in Bentinck Town to the south west of Kirkby-in-Ashfield, on the former Great Central Railway London to Manchester main line.

The closures of these lines left the area with no passenger rail services until the reopening of the former Midland Railway route, now known as the 'Robin Hood Line', in the 1990s.  However, by this time British Rail had abandoned the original Midland alignment through Kirkby-in-Ashfield town centre, and the remaining freight trains instead passed through the town by way of a short remnant of yet another line.
The town's new station is therefore located on part of the former Great Northern Railway Nottingham to Shirebrook line, which had not previously had a station at this location.

Services
All services at Kirkby-in-Ashfield are operated by East Midlands Railway.

On Sundays, the station is served by a two-hourly service between Nottingham and Mansfield Woodhouse, with no service to Worksop. Sunday services to Worksop are due to recommence at the station during the life of the East Midlands franchise.

Facilities

The station is located ¼ mile from the centre of town in a cutting around 40 feet below street level. Access to the platforms is via two ramps with a small number of steps so is not recommended for use by wheelchair passengers unless the operator of the chair is very fit.

There are no toilet facilities on this station.

Local transport connections

There are regular bus service operating outside the station by Trent Barton to the local area but there is no taxi rank.

Future

There are plans to reopen the line between Kirkby-in-Ashfield and Pye Bridge (currently freight only) to link with the planned HS2 station at Toton.

References

External links

Railway stations in Nottinghamshire
DfT Category F2 stations
Railway stations opened by Railtrack
Railway stations in Great Britain opened in 1996
Railway stations served by East Midlands Railway
Kirkby-in-Ashfield